Little River Township may refer to:

Arkansas
 Little River Township, Little River County, Arkansas, in Little River County, Arkansas
 Little River Township, Mississippi County, Arkansas, in Mississippi County, Arkansas
 Little River Township, Poinsett County, Arkansas, in Poinsett County, Arkansas

Kansas
 Little River Township, Reno County, Kansas, in Reno County, Kansas

Missouri
 Little River Township, Pemiscot County, Missouri

North Carolina
 Little River Township, Alexander County, North Carolina, in Alexander County, North Carolina
 Little River Township, Caldwell County, North Carolina, in Caldwell County, North Carolina
 Little River Township, Montgomery County, North Carolina, in Montgomery County, North Carolina
 Little River Township, Orange County, North Carolina, in Orange County, North Carolina
 Little River Township, Transylvania County, North Carolina, in Transylvania County, North Carolina
 Little River Township, Wake County, North Carolina

Township name disambiguation pages